Raduhn is a village and a former municipality  in the Ludwigslust-Parchim district, in Mecklenburg-Vorpommern, Germany. Since 7 June 2009, it is part of the municipality Lewitzrand.

Villages in Mecklenburg-Western Pomerania